Mahatma Public School is a non-sectarian school in Erimayur, a village in Palakkad district, Kerala, India. It was  founded by the Dr. Azad Memorial Charitable and Educational Trust  in 2004.
The school is affiliated to the Central Board for Secondary Education.

External links

References

Schools in Palakkad district